All Times Through Paradise is a box set compilation comprising the Saints' albums, singles released between 1977 and 1978, their EP One Two Three Four and unreleased 1977 performances from Paddington Town Hall, Sydney and The Hope and Anchor, London (titled Live In London 26/11/77). The discs were later released separately in 2007, except for Live In London 26/11/77 which remained exclusive to this set.

Track listing

Disc 1: (I'm) Stranded, out-takes and non album tracks

Disc 2: Eternally Yours and The International Robot Sessions

Disc 3: Prehistoric Sounds, out-take and Live at Paddington Town Hall, Sydney 21 April 1977

Disc 4: Live In London 26/11/77

References

External links
 

The Saints (Australian band) compilation albums
2004 compilation albums